Jan Jansz de Jonge Stampioen (1610, Rotterdam - 1653, The Hague) was a Dutch mathematician famous for his published work on spherical trigonometry. In 1638 he moved to The Hague to become tutor of William II, Prince of Orange. In 1644 he was employed to tutor Christiaan Huygens in mathematics.

External links
Biography
 Frontpage of the book on algebra (1639) for William II

1610 births
1653 deaths
17th-century Dutch mathematicians
Dutch cartographers
Scientists from Rotterdam